Megachile imitata is a species of bee in the family Megachilidae. It was described by Smith in 1853.

Description
Megachile imitata is only found in South Africa.

The species was described by Smith in 1853, and he stated the following:

He also stated that the species appearance in general resembled closely to that of Megachile mystacea and Megachile rufiventris.

References

Imitata
Insects described in 1853